Danda Gopuram is a 1981 Indian Malayalam film, directed by P. Chandrakumar. The film stars Madhu, Srividya, Sukumaran and Bahadoor in the lead roles. The film has musical score by Shyam.

Cast
Madhu
Srividya
Sukumaran
Bahadoor
Seema
T. M. Abraham

Soundtrack
The music was composed by Shyam and the lyrics were written by Sathyan Anthikkad.

References

External links
 

1981 films
1980s Malayalam-language films
Films directed by P. Chandrakumar